Nathalia Pinheiro Felipe Martins, known professionally as Nathalia Kaur, is a Brazilian model and actress who works in Indian cinema.

Early life
Kaur was born as Nathalia Pinheiro Felipe Martins in Rio de Janeiro, Brazil. Her mother has Portuguese ancestry, while the exact ancestry of her father is little known; in an interview, Kaur said that she is "half Punjabi", and that her father is half Indian, being her paternal grandfather of the Punjabi and her paternal grandmother of Portuguese.

Kaur worked as a model since she was 14 and continued to do so while studying law at Universidade Cândido Mendes before quitting to work as full-time model when receiving an offer in India. She is also known to be an opera singer.

Career
Kaur modelled in Brazil and other countries until moving to India upon receiving an offer. There she won the Kingfisher Calendar Model Hunt in 2012 and appeared in the Kingfisher Swimsuit Calendar that year.

Kaur made her film debut in the Kannada film Dev Son of Mudde Gowda directed by Indrajit Lankesh. Before its release she was cast by Ram Gopal Varma to perform an item number in his next film Department. Earlier Varma had wanted to cast Sunny Leone, but due to her contractual obligations for Jism 2, Varma replaced her with Kaur. In 2015, she participated in Colors TV's stunt show Fear Factor: Khatron Ke Khiladi 6.

Personal life
Kaur was Miss Mundo Espírito Santo 2015 and she participated at the Miss Brazil World 2015 (Miss Mundo Brasil) pageant, where she finished in the top 10.. Later, she was Miss Rio de Janeiro Be Emotion 2015 and had participated in Miss Brazil 2015 where she finished in the top 15.

Filmography
 

Television
 2014 - Fear Factor: Khatron Ke Khiladi 6 (Contestant)

References

External links

 
 

Year of birth missing (living people)
Living people
Actresses from Rio de Janeiro (city)
Brazilian female models
Brazilian film actresses
Universidade Candido Mendes alumni
Brazilian people of Indian descent
Brazilian people of Portuguese descent
Brazilian expatriate actresses in India
Actresses in Hindi cinema
Actresses in Telugu cinema
Actresses in Tamil cinema
Actresses in Kannada cinema
21st-century Brazilian actresses
Fear Factor: Khatron Ke Khiladi participants